Gérard Voisin (born August 18, 1945 in Mâcon, Saône-et-Loire) is a member of the National Assembly of France.  He represents the Saône-et-Loire department,  and is a member of the Union for a Popular Movement.

References

1945 births
Living people
People from Mâcon
Politicians from Bourgogne-Franche-Comté
Union for French Democracy politicians
Union for a Popular Movement politicians
Deputies of the 10th National Assembly of the French Fifth Republic
Deputies of the 11th National Assembly of the French Fifth Republic
Deputies of the 12th National Assembly of the French Fifth Republic
Deputies of the 13th National Assembly of the French Fifth Republic